Notum, palmitoleoyl-protein carboxylesterase is a protein that in humans is encoded by the NOTUM gene.

References

Further reading

External links 
 PDBe-KB provides an overview of all the structure information available in the PDB for Human Palmitoleoyl-protein carboxylesterase NOTUM